Hocine Haciane Constantin (born 7 July 1986 in Andorra la Vella) is an Olympic and national record holding swimmer from Andorra.  At the 2004 Olympics, he was Andorra's flagbearer.

He has swum for Andorra at the:
Olympics: 2004, 2008, 2012
World Championships:2003, 2005, 2009, 2011
Mediterranean Games: 2009
GSSE: 2001, 2003, 2005, 2007, 2009, 2011
Short Course Worlds: 2010

Notes

References

External links
 
 

1986 births
Living people
Andorran male swimmers
Olympic swimmers of Andorra
Swimmers at the 2004 Summer Olympics
Swimmers at the 2008 Summer Olympics
Swimmers at the 2012 Summer Olympics